Khurais oil field is an oil field in Saudi Arabia that went online on June 10, 2009, adjacent to the world's largest, the Ghawar trend. The Khurais field, with an area of 2,890 km2 and 127 km long, is located about 250 km southwest of Dhahran and 150 km east-northeast of Riyadh. Pilot-scale production at Khurais began in 1963, but the field was never fully developed.

Khurais Megaproject
A project to develop this field along with Abu Jifan and Mazalij oil fields is called the Khurais Megaproject. The project began in 2006, is led by Halliburton for wells drilling, Snamprogetti for crude and utilities, Hyundai for gas. It is expected to cost $3 billion, and is expected to increase Saudi Arabia's export capacity from 11.3 to 12.5 million bpd. It will produce Arabian light crude, as well as 315 million scfd of sour gas for Shedgum Gas Plant and 70,000 bpd of Natural Gas Liquids (NGL) for Yanbu Gas Plant.

The remote oil complex is served by Khurais Airport, which provides air service for personnel commuting on a weekly basis from the Dammam area.

See also

2019 Abqaiq–Khurais attack

References

External links
Khurais Megaproject
Saudi Aramco website.
map of oil and gas infrastructure in Saudi Arabia

 
Eastern Province, Saudi Arabia
Oil fields of Saudi Arabia
Saudi Aramco oil and gas fields